USS Scorpion (SSN-589) was a Skipjack-class nuclear-powered submarine that served in the United States Navy, and the sixth vessel, and second submarine, of the U.S. Navy to carry that name.

Scorpion was lost with all hands on 22 May 1968. She is one of two nuclear submarines the U.S. Navy has lost, the other being .

The wreckage of the ship remains in the North Atlantic Ocean with all its armaments and nuclear reactor.

Service 

Scorpions keel was laid down 20 August 1958 by General Dynamics Electric Boat in Groton, Connecticut. She was launched 19 December 1959, sponsored by Elizabeth S. Morrison, the daughter of the last commander of the World War II-era , Lt. Cdr. Maximilian Gmelich Schmidt (that ship was also lost with all hands, in 1944). Scorpion was commissioned 29 July 1960, with Commander Norman B. Bessac in command. (See USS George Washington for information on how that submarine had originally been laid down with the name and hull number, USS Scorpion SSN-589, intended to be an attack submarine.)

Service: 1960–1967 
Assigned to Submarine Squadron 6, Division 62, Scorpion departed New London, Connecticut, on 24 August for a two-month European deployment. During that time, she participated in exercises with 6th Fleet units and NATO-member navies. After returning to New England in late October, she trained along the Eastern Seaboard until May 1961. On 9 August 1961, she returned to New London, moving to Norfolk, Virginia, a month later. In 1962, she earned a Navy Unit Commendation.

Norfolk was Scorpions port for the remainder of her career, and she specialized in developing nuclear submarine warfare tactics. Varying roles from hunter to hunted, she participated in exercises along the Atlantic Coast, and in Bermuda and Puerto Rico operating areas. From June 1963 to May 1964, she underwent an overhaul at Charleston. She resumed duty in late spring, but regular duties were again interrupted from 4 August to 8 October for a transatlantic patrol. In the spring of 1965, she conducted a similar patrol in European waters.

In 1966, she deployed for special operations. After completing those assignments, her commanding officer received a Navy Commendation Medal for outstanding leadership, foresight, and professional skill. Other Scorpion officers and crewmen were also cited for meritorious achievement. Scorpion is reputed to have entered an inland Russian sea during a "Northern Run" in 1966, where the crew filmed a Soviet missile launch through her periscope before fleeing from Soviet Navy ships.

Overhaul: 1967 
On 1 February 1967, Scorpion entered Norfolk Naval Shipyard for a refueling overhaul. Instead of a much-needed complete overhaul, though, she received only emergency repairs to get quickly back on duty. The preferred SUBSAFE program required increased submarine overhaul times, from 9 to 36 months. SUBSAFE required intensive vetting of submarine component quality, coupled with various improvements and intensified structural inspections – particularly of hull welding, using ultrasonic testing.

Cold War pressures had prompted U.S. Submarine Force Atlantic (SUBLANT) officers to cut corners. The last overhaul of the Scorpion cost one-seventh of those performed on other nuclear submarines at the same time. This was the result of concerns about the "high percentage of time offline" for nuclear attack submarines, estimated at 40% of total available duty time.

Scorpions original "full overhaul" was reduced in scope. Long-overdue SUBSAFE work, such as a new central valve control system, was not performed. Crucially, her emergency system was not corrected for the same problems that destroyed Thresher. While Charleston Naval Shipyard claimed the emergency main ballast tank blow (EMBT) system worked as-is, SUBLANT claimed it did not, and their EMBT was "tagged out" (listed as unusable). Perceived problems with overhaul duration led to a delay on all SUBSAFE work in 1967.

Chief of Naval Operations Admiral David Lamar McDonald approved Scorpions reduced overhaul on 17 June 1966. On 20 July, McDonald deferred SUBSAFE extensions, otherwise deemed essential since 1963.

Service: 1967–1968 

In late October 1967, Scorpion started refresher training and weapons-system acceptance tests, and was given a new commanding officer, Francis Slattery. Following type training out of Norfolk, Virginia, she got underway on 15 February 1968 for a Mediterranean Sea deployment. She operated with the 6th Fleet into May and then headed west for home.

Scorpion suffered several mechanical malfunctions, including a chronic problem with freon leakage from refrigeration systems. An electrical fire occurred in an escape trunk when a water leak shorted out a shore power connection.

After departing the Mediterranean on 16 May, Scorpion dropped two men at Naval Station Rota in Spain, one for a family emergency and one for health reasons. Some U.S. ballistic missile submarines (SSBNs) operated from the U.S. Naval base Rota; USS Scorpion is thought to have provided noise cover for  when they both departed to the Atlantic. Along with Soviet intelligence trawlers, Soviet fast nuclear attack submarines were attempting to detect and follow the U.S. submarines going out of Rota, in this case, two fast 32-knot Soviet  hunter-killer subs.

Scorpion was then detailed to observe Soviet naval activities in the Atlantic in the vicinity of the Azores. An Echo II-class submarine was operating with this Soviet task force, as well as a Russian guided-missile destroyer. Having observed and listened to the Soviet units, Scorpion prepared to head back to Naval Station Norfolk.

Disappearance: May 1968 
Scorpion attempted to send radio traffic to Naval Station Rota for an unusually long period beginning shortly before midnight on 20 May and ending after midnight on 21 May, but was only able to reach a Navy communications station in Nea Makri, Greece, which forwarded the messages to COMSUBLANT. Lt. John Roberts was handed Commander Slattery's last message that he was closing on the Soviet submarine and research group, running at a steady  at a depth of  "to begin surveillance of the Soviets." Scorpion was expected to arrive at her homeport of Norfolk, Virginia, on 27 May at 13:00 local time. After she was overdue for several hours, the Atlantic fleet launched a sea and air search during the peak search period from 28 to 30 May involving as many as 55 ships and 35 search aircraft. A brief radio message including Scorpion's codename Brandywine was received by several search parties on the evening of 29 May. The source could not be identified in the search area derived from the bearings of the radio message.

Search: 1968 

The Navy suspected possible failure and launched a search, but Scorpion and her crew were declared "presumed lost" on 5 June. Her name was struck from the Naval Vessel Register on 30 June. The search continued with a team of mathematical consultants led by Dr. John Piña Craven, the chief scientist of the Navy's Special Projects Division. They employed the methods of Bayesian search theory, initially developed during the search for a hydrogen bomb lost off the coast of Palomares, Spain, in January 1966 in the Palomares B-52 crash.

Some reports indicate that a large and secret search was launched three days before Scorpion was expected back from patrol. This and other declassified information led to speculation that the Navy knew of Scorpions destruction before the public search was launched.

This was after the Navy had released sound tapes from its underwater SOSUS listening system, which contained the sounds of the destruction of Scorpion. The court of inquiry was subsequently reconvened, and other vessels, including the bathyscaphe Trieste II, were dispatched to the scene to collect pictures and other data.

Craven received much credit for locating the wreckage of Scorpion, although Gordon Hamilton was instrumental in defining a compact "search box" wherein the wreck was ultimately found. He was an acoustics expert who pioneered the use of hydroacoustics to pinpoint Polaris missile splashdown locations, and he had established a listening station in the Canary Islands, which obtained a clear signal of the vessel's pressure hull imploding as it passed crush depth. Naval Research Laboratory scientist Chester Buchanan used a towed camera sled of his own design aboard Mizar and finally located Scorpion.

Observed damage 

The bow of Scorpion appears to have skidded upon impact with the globigerina ooze on the sea floor, digging a sizable trench. The sail had been dislodged, as the hull of the operations compartment upon which it perched disintegrated, and was lying on its port side. One of Scorpions running lights was in the open position, as if it had been on the surface at the time of the mishap, although it may have been left in the open position during the vessel's recent nighttime stop at Rota. One Trieste II pilot who dived on Scorpion said that the shock of the implosion may have knocked the light into the open position.

The secondary Navy investigation – using extensive photographic, video, and eyewitness inspections of the wreckage in 1969 – suggested that Scorpions hull was crushed by implosion forces as it sank below crush depth. The Structural Analysis Group, which included Naval Ship Systems Command's Submarine Structures director Peter Palermo, plainly saw that the torpedo room was intact, though it had been pinched by excessive sea pressure. The operations compartment collapsed at frame 33, this being the king frame of the hull, reaching its structural limit first. The conical/cylindrical transition piece at frame 67 followed instantly. The operations compartment was largely obliterated by sea pressure, and the engine room had telescoped  forward into the hull due to collapse pressure, when the cone-to-cylinder transition junction failed between the auxiliary machine space and the engine room.

The only damage to the torpedo room compartment appeared to be a hatch missing from the forward escape trunk. Palermo pointed out that this would have occurred when water pressure entered the torpedo room at the moment of implosion.

The sail was ripped off, as the hull beneath it folded inward. The propulsion shaft came out of the boat; the engineering section had collapsed inward in a telescoping fashion. The broken boat fell another  to the ocean floor.

Photos taken in 1986 by Alvin, released by the Navy in 2012, show the broken inboard end of the propulsion shaft.

Navy investigations

Court of inquiry report: 1968 
Shortly after her sinking, the Navy assembled a court of inquiry to investigate the incident and to publish a report regarding the likely causes for its loss. The report's findings were first made public on 31 January 1969. While ruling out sabotage, the report said: "The certain cause of the loss of the Scorpion cannot be ascertained from evidence now available."

In 1984, the Norfolk Virginian-Pilot and The Ledger-Star obtained documents related to the inquiry, and reported that the likely cause of the disaster was the detonation of a torpedo while the Scorpions own crew attempted to disarm it. The U.S. Navy declassified many of the inquiry's documents in 1993.

Naval Ordnance Laboratory report: 1970 
An extensive, year-long analysis of Gordon Hamilton's hydroacoustic signals of the submarine's demise was conducted by Robert Price, Ermine (Meri) Christian, and Peter Sherman of the Naval Ordnance Laboratory (NOL). All three physicists were experts on undersea explosions, their sound signatures, and their destructive effects. Price was also an open critic of Craven. Their opinion, presented to the Navy as part of the phase II investigation, was that the death noises likely occurred at  when the hull failed. Fragments then continued in a free fall for another . This appears to differ from conclusions drawn by Craven and Hamilton, who pursued an independent set of experiments as part of the same phase II probe, demonstrating that alternate interpretations of the hydroacoustic signals were possibly based on the submarine's depth at the time it was stricken and other operational conditions.

The Structural Analysis Group (SAG) concluded that an explosive event was unlikely and was highly dismissive of Craven and Hamilton's tests. The SAG physicists argued that the absence of a bubble pulse, which invariably occurs in an underwater explosion, is absolute evidence that no torpedo explosion occurred outside or inside the hull. Craven had attempted to prove that Scorpions hull could "swallow" the bubble pulse of a torpedo detonation by having Gordon Hamilton detonate small charges next to air-filled steel containers.

The 1970 Naval Ordnance Laboratory "Letter", the acoustics study of Scorpion destruction sounds by Price and Christian, was a supporting study within the SAG report. In its conclusions and recommendations section, the NOL acoustic study states: "The first SCORPION acoustic event was not caused by a large explosion, either internal or external to the hull. The probable depth of occurrence  ... and the spectral characteristics of the signal support this. In fact, it is very unlikely that any of the Scorpion acoustic events were caused by explosions."

The NOL based many of its findings on an extensive acoustic analysis of the torpedoing and sinking of the decommissioned submarine  in the Pacific in early 1969, seeking to compare its acoustic signals to those generated by Scorpion. Price found the Navy's scheduled sinking of Sterlet fortunate. Nonetheless, Sterlet was a small World War II-era diesel-electric submarine of a vastly different design and construction from Scorpion with regard to its pressure hull and other characteristics. Its sinking resulted in three identifiable acoustic signals, as compared to Scorpions 15.

The NOL acoustics study provided a highly debated explanation as to how Scorpion may have reached its crush depth by anecdotally referring to the near-loss incident of the diesel submarine  in January 1969, when a power problem caused her to sink almost to crush depth, before surfacing.

In the same May 2003 N77 letter excerpted above (see 1. with regard to the Navy's view of a forward explosion), however, the following statement appears to dismiss the NOL theory, and again unequivocally point the finger toward an explosion forward:

Wreck site 

The U.S. Navy periodically revisits the site to determine whether wreckage has been disturbed and to test for the release of any fissile materials from the submarine's nuclear reactor or two nuclear weapons. Except for a few photographs taken by deep-water submersibles in 1968 and 1985, the U.S. Navy has never made public any physical surveys it has conducted on the wreck. The last photos were taken by Robert Ballard and a team of oceanographers from Woods Hole using the submersible in 1985. The U.S. Navy secretly lent Ballard the submersible to visit the wreck sites of the Thresher and Scorpion.

Due to the radioactive nature of the Scorpion wreck site, the U.S. Navy has had to publish what specific environmental sampling it has done of the sediment, water, and marine life around the sunken submarine to establish what impact it has had on the deep-ocean environment. The information is contained within an annual public report on the U.S. Navy's environmental monitoring for all U.S. nuclear-powered ships and boats. The reports explain the methodology for conducting deep-sea monitoring from both surface vessels and submersibles. These reports say the lack of radioactivity outside the wreck shows the nuclear fuel aboard the submarine remains intact and no uranium in excess of levels expected from the fallout from past atmospheric testing of nuclear weapons has been detected during naval inspections. Likewise, the two nuclear-tipped Mark 45 torpedoes that were lost when the Scorpion sank show no signs of instability. The plutonium and uranium cores of these weapons likely corroded to a heavy, insoluble material soon after the sinking. The materials remain at or close to their original location inside the boat's torpedo room. If the corroded materials were released outside the submarine, their density and insolubility would cause them to settle into the sediment.

Call for inquiry: 2012 
In November 2012, the U.S. Submarine Veterans, an organization with over 13,800 members, asked the U.S. Navy to reopen the investigation on the sinking of USS Scorpion. The Navy rejected the request. A private group including family members of the lost submariners stated they would investigate the wreckage on their own, since it was located in international waters. However, tampering with sunken military vessels is illegal because they are considered military graveyards.

Theories about the loss

Hydrogen explosion during battery charge 
A hydrogen explosion as the proximal cause for the loss of Scorpion was assessed and analyzed by retired acoustics expert Bruce Rule, a long-time analyst for the Integrated Undersea Surveillance System (IUSS), in his IUSS alumni association blog. Based on his own experiences, Rear Admiral Dave Oliver, who served in both diesel boats and nuclear submarines, provides his assessment in his book Against the Tide that Scorpion was lost as a result of hydrogen build-up due to changes in the ventilation lineup while proceeding to periscope depth. Most recently, following analysis of the ship's battery cells, this is the leading theory for the loss of Scorpion. This is consistent with two small explosions aboard the submarine, a half-second apart, that were picked up by hydrophones.

Accidental activation of torpedo 
The classified version of the U.S. Navy's court of inquiry's report, finally released in 1993, listed accidents involving the Mark 37 torpedo as 3 of the most probable causes for the loss of submarine, including a hot-running torpedo, an accidentally or deliberately launched weapon, or the inadvertent activation of a torpedo by stray voltage.  The acoustic homing torpedo, in a fully ready condition and lacking a propeller guard, is theorized by some to have started running within the tube. Released from the tube, the torpedo then somehow became fully armed and successfully engaged its nearest target: Scorpion herself.

Explosion of torpedo inside sub 
A later theory was that a torpedo may have exploded in the tube, caused by an uncontrollable fire in the torpedo room. The book Blind Man's Bluff documents findings and investigation by Dr. John Craven, who surmised that a likely cause could have been the overheating of a faulty battery. The Mark 46 silver–zinc battery used in the Mark 37 torpedo had a tendency to overheat, and in extreme cases could cause a fire that was strong enough to cause a low-order detonation of the warhead. If such a detonation had occurred, it might have opened the boat's large torpedo-loading hatch and caused Scorpion to flood and sink. However, while Mark 46 batteries have been known to generate so much heat that the torpedo casings blistered, none is known to have damaged a boat or caused an explosion.

Craven mentions that he did not work on the Mark 37 torpedo's propulsion system and became aware of the possibility of a battery explosion only 20 years after the loss of Scorpion. In his book The Silent War, he recounts running a simulation with former Scorpion executive officer Lieutenant Commander Robert Fountain, Jr. commanding the simulator. Fountain was told he was headed home at 18 knots (33 km/h) at a depth of his choice, then there was an alarm of "hot-running torpedo". Fountain responded with "right full rudder", a quick turn that would activate a safety device and keep the torpedo from arming. Then, an explosion in the torpedo room was introduced into the simulation. Fountain ordered emergency procedures to surface the boat, stated Dr. Craven, "but instead, she continued to plummet, reaching collapse depth and imploding in 90 seconds – one second shy of the acoustic record of the actual event."

Craven, who was the chief scientist of the Navy's Special Projects Office, which had management responsibility for the design, development, construction, operational test and evaluation, and maintenance of the UGM-27 Polaris fleet missile system, had long believed Scorpion was struck by her own torpedo, but revised his views during the mid-1990s, when he learned that engineers testing Mark 46 batteries at Keyport, Washington, just before the Scorpion's loss, said the batteries leaked electrolyte and sometimes burned while outside their casings during lifetime shock, heat, and cold testing. Although the battery manufacturer was accused of building bad batteries, it was later able to successfully prove its batteries were no more prone to failure than those made by other manufacturers.

Intentional firing of defective torpedo 
Twenty years later, Craven learned that the boat could have been destroyed by a "hot-running torpedo." Other subs in the fleet had replaced their defective torpedo batteries, but the Navy wanted Scorpion to complete its mission first. If Scorpion had fired a defective torpedo, it could have sought out a target and turned back to strike the sub that launched it.

Structural damage 
Photographs of the USS Scorpion wreck show the submarine's detached shaft and propeller, missing a rotor blade. Some experienced U.S. submariners attribute the loss of the submarine to flooding caused by the detached shaft. Given that antisubmarine torpedoes were designed to seek the sound of the cavitation of the target submarine's propeller, this could be damage caused by such a weapon.

Malfunction of trash disposal unit 
During the 1968 inquiry, Vice Admiral Arnold F. Shade testified that he believed that a malfunction of the trash disposal unit (TDU) was the trigger for the disaster. Shade theorized that the boat was flooded when the TDU was operated at periscope depth and that other subsequent failures of material or personnel while dealing with the TDU-induced flooding led to the submarine's demise.

Soviet attack 
The book All Hands Down by Kenneth Sewell and Jerome Preisler (Simon and Schuster, 2008) concludes that Scorpion was destroyed while en route to gather intelligence on a Soviet naval group conducting operations in the Atlantic. While the mission for which the submarine was diverted from her original course back to her home port is a matter of record, its details remain classified.

Ed Offley's book Scorpion Down promotes a hypothesis suggesting that Scorpion was sunk by a Soviet submarine during a standoff that started days before 22 May. Offley also cites that it occurred roughly at the time of the submarine's intelligence-gathering mission, for which she was redirected from her original heading for home; according to Offley, the flotilla had just been harassed by another U.S. submarine, . W. Craig Reed, who served on Haddo a decade later as a petty officer and diver, and whose father was a U.S. Navy officer responsible in significant electronic support measures, advances in sub detection in the early 1960s, recounted similar scenarios to Offley in Red November, over Soviet torpedoing of Scorpion and details his own service on USS Haddo in 1977 running inside Soviet waters off Vladivostok, when torpedoes appeared to have been fired at Haddo, but were immediately put down by the captain as a Soviet torpedo exercise.

Both All Hands Down and Scorpion Down point toward involvement by the KGB spy ring (the so-called Walker spy ring) led by John Anthony Walker, Jr., in the heart of the U.S. Navy's communications, stating that it could have known that Scorpion was coming to investigate the Soviet flotilla. According to this theory, both navies agreed to hide the truth about both USS Scorpion and K-129 incidents. Several USN and RN submarines collided with Soviet Echo-class subs in Russian and British waters in this period, showing greatly enhanced aggression in Soviet Navy sub operations in 1968. The navy Minister in the British Labour government, noted 11 such deliberate collisions. Having realized it was being pursued, "a very aggressive Soviet captain turned his submarine and drove her straight at HMS Conqueror. It had been an extremely close call."

According to a translated article from Pravda, Moscow never issued a "fire" command during the Cold War. This is disputed by Royal Navy officers, "there had been other occasions when harassed Russians had fired torpedoes to scare off trails". The Navy court of inquiry official statement confirms that the Soviet naval group, including an Echo-II submarine, was conducting a "hydro-acoustic operation" in the area, but they were about 200 miles to the west of Scorpion'''s position at the time of the sinking. Adding to the body of evidence against a Soviet torpedo-attack theory, U.S. Navy submarine Captain Robert LaGassa has flatly stated, "no Soviet submarine in 1968 could detect, track, approach, and attack any Skipjack- or later-class U.S. submarine".
During 1967, though, the large Soviet nuclear submarine-building program, and the view of naval officers and in particular Admiral Rickover, that Defense Secretary R. McNamara, Naval Intelligence and CIA assessments underrated the speed of even existing Soviet subs and their threat led to 2 major tests on the request of Rickover. On 3–5 January 1968, the CVN USS Enterprise proved unable to outrun a Soviet November SSN at flank speed of 30/31 knots. This showed the Soviet November SSN, 5 knots faster than 'shatteringly' wrong intelligence estimates and underwater tracking a US CVN on sonar at 30 knots.  Sec. McNamara remained opposed to a new fast SSN 688 class leader capable of 30 knots. His deputy and the chief sea warfare advisor to head of USN scientific engineering research James Nunan advised against SSN 688 or the need or reason for an enlarged, fast, 30-knot Sturgeon on 18 December 1967 in favor of long-term research into a new small 'conform' nuclear design.  McNamara apparently attempted to have Rickover court-martialed and removed from office at this point.

However, the USN case for SSN 688 after the hijacking of USS Pueblo in January 1968 and the Tet offensive in February 1968, which showed new communist aggression, was resubmitted. The plan and requirement for new fast SSNs was accepted by USN Chief of Staff Admiral Thomas Moorer after further inquiry in March 1968, but was not accepted by the US government. Events in May 1968 led to Admiral Rickover and Chief of USN Scientific Research and Engineering, John S Foster, appearing before the US Senate and House armed forces committees in the first week of June 1968, and it was decided to order an immediate test to illustrate to Foster that the tactical advantage of speed in a SSN could outweigh stealth and quietness. The radical test was conducted with a top USN Permit-class SSN crew aboard USS Dace captained by Cdr K. McKee and a crew with experience running in Russian waters engaging in a hunt and attempt to simulate a torpedo attack on a fast Skipjack-class, the USS Shark, with a declared speed of 29 knots. While the trial was successful, it showed just how difficult a faster, noisier submarine like Shark was to engage, and by implication that an even faster November-class Soviet sub, while noisy, might well have been able to engage a 29-knot Skipjack.

 U.S. Navy conclusions 
The results of the U.S. Navy's various investigations into the loss of Scorpion are inconclusive. While the court of inquiry never endorsed Dr. Craven's torpedo theory regarding the loss of Scorpion, its "findings of facts" released in 1993 carried Craven's torpedo theory at the head of a list of possible causes of Scorpions loss.

 Books 

 Silent Steel 
Released in 2006, Stephen Johnson's Silent Steel: The Mysterious Death of the Nuclear Attack Sub USS Scorpion provides a detailed listing of every mechanical problem on the submarine cited by the Navy or mentioned in crewmen's letters, but does not solve the Scorpions sinking. Johnson, a critic of Dr. Craven, agrees with Navy scientists who, in 1970, gave their opinion that the sub's hull was smashed by implosion damage and not a torpedo blast, a finding they support with their interpretation of certain evidence about the condition of the hull and hydroacoustic recordings of the disaster. Silent Steel portrays an overworked submarine denied needed maintenance and manned by a demoralized crew, a depiction contradicted by many former Scorpion enlisted men and officers, and based in part on the testimony of sailors who had applied for transfer from the boat. Johnson also enumerates many of the Navy-wide submarine maintenance issues that denied Scorpion an overhaul and overdue safety improvements, though the Navy would maintain that virtually all necessary and vital improvements and repairs were made on the submarine before her final deployment. The Submarine Safety Program (SUBSAFE), initiated following the 1963 loss of Thresher, delayed new submarine construction and sub overhauls by monopolizing skilled workers and critical spare parts. Fearing that a normal overhaul and safety work during 1967 might sideline Scorpion for three years, it was selected for a brief experimental overhaul, but this was canceled due to a shortage of workers. Scorpion sank eight months after leaving Norfolk Naval Shipyard.

 Blind Man's Bluff 
In 1998, two New York Times reporters published Blind Man's Bluff: The Untold Story of American Submarine Espionage, a book providing a rare look into the world of nuclear submarines and espionage during the Cold War. One lengthy chapter deals extensively with Scorpion and her loss. The book reports that concerns about the Mk 37 conventional torpedo carried aboard Scorpion were raised in 1967 and 1968, before Scorpion left Norfolk for her last mission. The concerns focused on the battery that powered the torpedoes. The battery had a thin metal-foil barrier separating two types of volatile chemicals. When mixed slowly and in a controlled fashion, the chemicals generated heat and electricity, powering the motor that pushed the torpedo through the water, but vibrations normally experienced on a nuclear submarine were found to cause the thin foil barrier to break down, allowing the chemicals to interact intensely. This interaction generated excessive heat, which in tests, could readily have caused an inadvertent torpedo explosion. The authors of Blind Man's Bluff do not directly contradict the official findings, but highlight information discovered during the investigation, which contradicts the investigation's findings, but are not addressed in the report. Notably, the book cites a hot-running torpedo incident on the USS Sargo (SSN-583) prior to the loss of Scorpion, although Sargo was moored at the time and not lost.

 Red Star Rogue 

In 1995, when Peter Huchthausen began work on a book about the Soviet underwater fleet, he interviewed former Soviet Admiral Victor Dygalo, who stated that the true history of K-129 has not been revealed because of the informal agreement between the two countries' senior naval commands. The purpose of that secrecy, he alleged, is to stop any further research into the losses of either Scorpion or K-129. Huchthausen states that Dygalo told him to "forget about ever resolving these sad issues for the surviving families."

 All Hands Down All Hands Down was written by Kenneth R. Sewell, a nuclear engineer and a U.S. Navy veteran who spent five years aboard , a fast attack submarine. It attempts to link the sinking of Scorpion with the Pueblo incident, the John Anthony Walker spy ring, and Cold War Soviet aggression. The thesis of this book is that action off the Canary Islands was the direct cause of the sinking. The author purports that this is supported by motives in the Soviet Navy following the sinking of K-129, which caused the Russian Navy to trap a U.S. submarine. The bait for this trap would be strange military operations and furtive naval manoeuvres in the Atlantic, accompanied by countermeasures that would seemingly be defeated only by the deployment of a nuclear submarine. With information from spying by Walker, the position and arrival time of Scorpion was known by the Russians, and its sinking followed the springing of the trap. The book claims Scorpion was sunk by a Ka-25 helicopter equipped with antisubmarine torpedoes, which took off from one ship and landed on a different one. This was so that no one, other than the aircrew of the helicopter, would notice one torpedo missing.

The book then purports a cover-up by American and Soviet officials, to avoid public outrage and an increase in Cold War tension.

 Scorpion Down 
Ed Offley, a reporter on military affairs, has closely followed developments in information concerning the sinking of the Scorpion. His most recent article on the subject is "Buried at Sea" published in the Winter 2008 issue of the Quarterly Journal of Military History. This article summarizes the facts in the case as presented in his 2007 book Scorpion Down: Sunk by the Soviets, Buried by the Pentagon: The Untold Story of the USS Scorpion. In the book, Offley, gathering decades of his own research, hypothesizes that Scorpion was sunk by the Soviets, possibly in retaliation for the loss of K-129 earlier that year. The book paints a picture of increasing Soviet anger at U.S. Navy provocations — specifically, close-in monitoring of Soviet naval operations by almost every U.S. nuclear submarine. These machines, combined with daily crypto keys from the Walker spy ring, likely allowed the Soviets to monitor U.S. Navy ship dispositions and communications.

Offley contends that the Scorpion was tracked by several Soviet Navy assets from the Mediterranean to its final operational area south of the Azores, where it was then sunk by a Soviet torpedo. He claims the U.S. Navy was aware of the loss of the Scorpion on 21 May 1968, and by the night of 22 May 68, deep concern had arisen over the Scorpion after not receiving the required 24-hr, four-word communication check required on operational duty, in the SUBCOMLANT communication center at Norfolk on the evidence of two 2nd-class radiomen on the deck that night, among junior USN officers, and the unit supervisor, Warrant Officer J. Walker, confirmed to interested staff that no check transmission from Scorpion was received that night, and by the morning of 23 May 1968, the SUBCOMLANT center was full of admirals and a Marine general, and no doubt existed about the loss of Scorpion, and the US government and Navy were engaged in a massive cover-up, within days destroying much of the sound and communication data at SOSUS ground stations in the U.S. and Europe, and delaying any public indication of the loss until the ship's scheduled arrival at Norfolk, Virginia, five days later, partly to disguise the fact that U.S. nuclear subs were in constant or frequent communication with U.S. naval communication bases and that the subsequent search for the Scorpion was a five-month-long deception to pretend they had no idea of the hull's location.

The oral testimony Offley relied upon are recollections of surviving SOSUS recordings documenting torpedo sounds, evasion sounds, an explosion, and eventually the sounds of implosions as Scorpion plunged past crush depth.

 Against the Tide: Rickover's Leadership Principles and the Rise of the Nuclear Navy 
In a section from this 2014 book titled "The Danger of Culture", retired U.S. Navy Rear Admiral Dave Oliver offers the theory based on his own experiences that hydrogen explosion, either during or immediately following a battery charge, possibly destroyed USS Scorpion and killed her crew. The proximate cause in that scenario would have been the procedural carryover from diesel-boat days wherein the boat was effectively rigged for collision—with subsequent changes in ventilation flow and watertight condition—before proceeding to periscope depth by way of setting "Condition Baker".  Oliver had personally witnessed dangerously high hydrogen level spikes under such conditions aboard a nuclear submarine, specifically while going to periscope depth and setting Condition Baker during a battery charge. Diesel boats, in contrast, were not capable of doing a battery charge while deeply submerged, but were instead dealing with the risk of collision while on antisurface-ship operations when proceeding to periscope depth while in or near shipping lanes. In regard to NAVSEA responsibility, he further states: "I always felt that the investigators closed their eyes to the most likely cause because they did not want to acknowledge their own involvement in this tragedy. I had forwarded my letter about Condition Baker via some of the same people responsible for the Scorpion investigation."

 In popular culture 
Phil Ochs released a song on his album Rehearsals for Retirement'' (1969) titled "The Scorpion Departs but Never Returns".

See also 
 List of lost United States submarines
 List of sunken nuclear submarines

References

Sources

Further reading

External links 

 USS Scorpion SSN-589
 Memorial for 99 crew 
 
 World War II National Submarine Memorial – West
 World War II National Submarine Memorial – East
 U.S. Navy photographs of USS Scorpion
 On Eternal Patrol: USS Scorpion
 Search Operation Video

Cold War submarines of the United States
Lost submarines of the United States
Maritime incidents in 1968
Scorpion, USS
Shipwrecks in the Atlantic Ocean
Ships built in Groton, Connecticut
Skipjack-class submarines
Sunken nuclear submarines
United States submarine accidents
1959 ships
1968 in the United States
Warships lost with all hands
May 1968 events